Dick Kelsey (born Richmond Kelsey, Ventura, California; May 3, 1905 – May 3, 1987), was an important early animation art director, pioneer theme park designer, and illustrator of children's books. His career spanned several Disney films of the 1940s and 1950s, after which he assisted in the design of Disneyland in 1955. Translating the screen arts to real buildings, Kelsey was hired by the Marco Engineering firm of Cornelius Vanderbilt Wood to be a lead art director to design Magic Mountain theme park at Golden, Colorado in 1957. Later Kelsey became mentor to another prominent Disney artisan, Ron Dias, whose films include Sleeping Beauty. In time, Kelsey returned to Disney work, including Bedknobs and Broomsticks and illustrating children's books of Disney films. He died on his 82nd birthday.

Filmography

Art department
 So Dear To My Heart (1948)

Art director
 Bambi (1942)
 Dumbo (1941)
 Fantasia ("Rite of Spring" segment) (1940)
 Pinocchio (1940)

Miscellaneous crew
 Bedknobs and Broomsticks (1971)
 Melody Time (1948)

Writer
 Alice in Wonderland (1951)
 Make Mine Music (1946)

Architecture

Art director
 Magic Mountain (1957)

Assistant designer
 Disneyland (1955)

External links
 
 Virtual Museum of Magic Mountain
 Ron Dias website

1905 births
1987 deaths
American animators
Artists from California
Walt Disney Animation Studios people